Matodzi Mirriam Ramadwa is a South African politician. A member of the African National Congress, she was elected to the Limpopo Provincial Legislature in 2009. In 2013, she was appointed as the Member of the Executive Council (MEC) for Sports, Arts and Culture. Ramada was elected as the speaker of the provincial legislature in 2014. In 2015, she resigned as speaker. Ramadwa was elected to the National Assembly of South Africa in 2019.

Background
Ramadwa is a nurse by profession. She earned a certificate in  Leadership and Governance and a certificate in Labour Law from the University of the Witwatersrand. From the University of the Western Cape, she earned a diploma in Economic Management Science.

Political career
Ramadwa formerly served on the provincial executive committee (PEC) and the provincial working committee (PWC) of the African National Congress in Limpopo. She was also the acting chairperson of the Congress of South African Trade Unions (COASTU) in the province.

Ramadwa was elected to the Limpopo Provincial Legislature in 2009. In July 2013, she was appointed by premier Stanley Mathabatha as the Member of the Executive Council (MEC) for Sport, Arts and Culture. Following the 2014 general elections, Ramadwa was elected as the speaker of the provincial legislature. In May 2015, the ANC ordered Ramadwa to resign as speaker of the provincial legislature, so that ANC MP Polly Boshielo could replace her. She refused to resign as speaker. On 15 August 2015, the ANC suspended her membership pending disciplinary action.

Ramadwa finally resigned as speaker on 29 September 2015, the same day that the ANC's motion for her removal as speaker was set to be debated in the provincial legislature. The suspension of her ANC membership was lifted on 18 November 2015. She continued as an ordinary member of the provincial legislature until the 2019 elections. In the 2019 elections, Ramadwa was elected to the National Assembly of South Africa from the ANC's Limpopo list.

Personal life
In August 2019, it was revealed that Ramadwa had missed the deadline to move out of the provincial Parliamentary Village in Polokwane. She said that she wrote to the legislature and the public works department asking for her stay to be extended as she needed to search for schools in Cape Town for the two orphans she looks after.

References

External links

Living people
Year of birth missing (living people)
People from Limpopo
Women members of provincial legislatures of South Africa
Members of the Limpopo Provincial Legislature
African National Congress politicians
Members of the National Assembly of South Africa
Women members of the National Assembly of South Africa